"Moneda" (English: "Coin") is a 2016 song by American singer Prince Royce and Mexican singer Gerardo Ortiz. The song was released on October 7, 2016  as the third single taken from Royce's fifth studio album, Five (2017).

The music video premiered on October 28, 2016.

Charts

Certifications

References

2016 singles
2016 songs
Prince Royce songs
Sony Music Latin singles
Songs written by Prince Royce
Spanish-language songs
Male vocal duets
Songs written by Daniel Santacruz